Parliamentary elections were held in the Maldives on 2 December 1994. As there were no political parties at the time, all candidates ran as independents.

Results

References

Maldives
Parliamentary election
Elections in the Maldives
Non-partisan elections
Maldives
Election and referendum articles with incomplete results